Isola Vicentina is a small town and comune in the Italian province of Vicenza in the Veneto region. Its population is around 9,319.

History
Numerous  archeological  finds  from  various epochs bear witness to the ancient past of Isola Vicentina. These finds include pottery dating back to the  Iron Age,  a  column  with  an  inscription  in  a Venetian language, a Roman tombstone, and several Lombardic tombs.
It is evident from these discoveries that the territory where Isola Vicentina now lies was already very important  in  very  ancient  times.  This  was  due mainly to its geographical position along important roads to Vicenza and Schio. 
The  area  was  repeatedly  the  scene  of  conflict between the powerful ruling families of the day. All  of  the  territory  of  Vicenza,  including  Isola  Vicentina, became part of the Venetian Republic in the fifteenth century. 
Several centuries of peace followed, to be interrupted  only  by  the  arrival  of  Napoleon’s  troops  in  the late eighteenth century. Isola Vicentina was annexed to the Kingdom of Italy in 1866, along with the rest of the Veneto Region.

Arts
Villa  Branzo  Loschi-Drago  in Vallugana  is  an  eighteenth-century  building  that was designed by architect Domenico Cerato.

Villa Cerchiari.

Churches
The  Isola  Vicentina  Parish  Church  is  dedicated  to St. Peter. It is a very old church, and is thought to have been founded by St. Prosdocimus. It is mentioned in records from as early as the thirteenth century as being the parish church.
The Sanctuary of Santa Maria del Cengio is without doubt the most famous church in Isola Vicentina. It is also a very old church. We find it mentioned for the first time in records from the twelfth century, although it probably existed even earlier than that as a shelter for wayfarers and pilgrims.

The church building was renovated and given to the monks at San Brigida in the early fifteenth century. It  served  to  house  the  monks  until  the  monastery could be built.

In 1462,  the  Lateranense  canons  from  San  Bartolomeo di Vicenza took over the church. The fifteenth-century style of the building has been preserved  in  spite  of  the  numerous  changes  that have been made to it.

Twin towns
Isola Vicentina is twinned with:

  Mühlhausen, Upper Palatinate, Germany, since 1998
  Marau, Brazil, since 2012

See also
 Stele of Isola Vicentina

References

Cities and towns in Veneto